Goran Sankovič (18 June 1979 – 4 June 2022) was a Slovenian professional footballer who played as a defender for Slovenian team Celje, Czech team Slavia Prague, and Greek teams Akratitos and Panionios.

Career
Sankovič made 21 appearances for Slavia Prague in the Czech Republic. He joined Greek Superleague side Panionios in July 2003.

He played five full internationals for Slovenia, and was a member of the Slovenia squad at the 2002 FIFA World Cup, but was an unused substitute.

References

External links
Goran Sankovič at NZS 

1979 births
2022 deaths
Slovenian people of Croatian descent
Sportspeople from Celje
Slovenian footballers
Association football defenders
Slovenia international footballers
Slovenia under-21 international footballers
Slovenia youth international footballers
2002 FIFA World Cup players
NK Celje players
SK Slavia Prague players
A.P.O. Akratitos Ano Liosia players
Panionios F.C. players
Slovenian PrvaLiga players
Czech First League players
Super League Greece players
Slovenian expatriate footballers
Slovenian expatriate sportspeople in the Czech Republic
Expatriate footballers in the Czech Republic
Slovenian expatriate sportspeople in Greece
Expatriate footballers in Greece